Pectinodonta maxima is a species of sea snail, a true limpet, a marine gastropod mollusk in the family Pectinodontidae, one of the families of true limpets.

Description

Distribution

References

Pectinodontidae